Wangu Gome (born 13 February 1993) is a Namibian footballer who plays as a midfielder for the Namibia national team. He is known for his diminutive size and midfield capabilities.

Career

Club

Following his performance at the 2015 COSAFA Cup, Bidvest Wits F.C. signed the young midfielder on a one-season loan. He made his league debut for Bidvest Wits F.C. in a 0-1 victory over University of Pretoria F.C.
Originally on loan, Bidvest Wits F.C. decided to extend his contract to long-term in 2016.
Recently, he has had continuous inactivity, not making the squad against Al Ahly in the CAF Champions League.
Made his CAF Champions League debut for The Clever Boys fronting Light Stars FC.

His first trophy was the MTN 8 cup.

On 2 March 2020, Gome signed for Armenian Premier League club FC Alashkert. On 24 December 2022, Alashkert announced the departure of Gome.

International

Namibian Wangu Gome was given the 2015 COSAFA Cup Player of the tournament award by being Namibia's key player throughout the entire tournament.

Awards

1x COSAFA Cup Player of the Tournament

Honors

1x South African Premier Division runners-up
1x MTN 8 winner

References

External links
 

Living people
1993 births
Association football midfielders
F.C. Civics Windhoek players
Bidvest Wits F.C. players
Namibian expatriate footballers
Namibia international footballers
Expatriate soccer players in South Africa
Namibian expatriate sportspeople in South Africa
Footballers from Windhoek
Namibia Premier League players
Namibian men's footballers